Action Pack, also called Universal Action Pack, was a syndicated programming block series of television movies and television series created by Universal Television that aired from 1994 until 2001. The Action Pack included two hours of various television series produced by Renaissance Pictures and distributed by MCA TV (later known as Universal Television Enterprises and Studios USA Television Distribution).

Background
Previously, there were three attempts by MCA TV/Universal Television to launch some sort of organized independent programming. First, MCA TV launched the ad hoc movie Universal Pictures Debut Network in 1985. With Premier Program Service, MCA TV teamed up with Paramount for this planned network by October 1989 which was abandoned in February 1990. The last was a two night three-series Hollywood Premiere Network in 1990–91.

History
In 1994, the Action Pack initially ran as a Wheel series of television movies, which were all effectively pilots; if successful, they would become TV series the following season. The initial plan was for four films created from six franchises for the block including TekWar, Smokey and the Bandit, Midnight Run, Hercules: The Legendary Journeys, Vanishing Son and the working title Fastlane when offered at programming executive conference in January 1994.

On January 17 and 18, 1994, a dozen stations showed TekWar, the premiere TV movie of the programming block. The stations' ratings increased greatly with a 350% increase in KOFY in San Francisco. MCA cut Rob Cohen's Midnight Run to three films, so that star Christopher McDonald could star in a feature film. Cohen produced Knight Rider 2010 as a replacement. The block aired its first season until January 1995 and lost $30 million. TekWar was picked up as a regular TV series for the USA Network instead of Action Pack, starting in January 1995.

From January to June 1995, the block included Hercules: The Legendary Journeys and Vanishing Son. The Hercules series became a surprise hit as the third most watched first-run syndicated action hour. From September 1995 through January 2000, Action Pack included Hercules: The Legendary Journeys and its spinoff, Xena: Warrior Princess.  After Hercules ended its run in January 2000, the Universal Action Pack launched the Back2Back Action Hour consisting of two thirty-minute series: Jack of All Trades and Cleopatra 2525 to air alongside Xena. The lineup lasted until second quarter 2001. Jack of All Trades and Xena were canceled and Cleopatra 2525 was increased to an hour long show in January 2001.

After Xena, the most successful series on the Action Pack, completed airing its final season's reruns in the summer of 2001, Cleopatra 2525 also stopped production and the Action Pack block was discontinued.

Television movies
The television movies aired during the Action Pack's first year included:

Hercules series:
Hercules and the Amazon Women 
Hercules and the Lost Kingdom
Hercules and the Circle of Fire
Hercules in the Underworld 
Hercules in the Maze of the Minotaur

TekWar (Based on the books by William Shatner):
Tekwar 
TekLords 
Teklab 
TekJustice, an original story

The Midnight Run Action Pack, Midnight Run films (Spin-offs of the 1988 Robert De Niro film):

Another Midnight Run
Midnight Runaround
Midnight Run for Your Life

Bandit films (Spin-offs of the Smokey and the Bandit films):
Bandit Goes Country
Bandit Bandit
Beauty and the Bandit
Bandit's Silver Angel

Vanishing Son films:
Vanishing Son I
Vanishing Son II
Vanishing Son III
Vanishing Son IV

Starting as a series of four made for television movies in 1994, the series debuted on January 16, 1995. Vanishing Son I, Vanishing Son II, Vanishing Son III, and Vanishing Son IV, were aired on February 28, July 18, July 25, and October 10, 1994, respectively. The series was ground-breaking for the casting of an Asian male in an attractive leading-man role.

An additional movie was a part of the initial lineup, titled Fastlane was set to be directed by John Landis and would concern two friends finding a spaceship/car hybrid vehicle. However, for unknown reasons the project never actually made it to air. The "shell" prop for the spaceship/car (which was designed to fit over a Pontiac Fiero) was auctioned off in 2007.

Knight Rider 2010 (1994)
The Adventures of Captain Zoom (December 9, 1995)
 Beastmaster III: The Eye of Braxus (May 24th, 1996)
 Atlantis: The Lost Continent, first shown on a Starz/Encore network channel in March 1997 before being run on Action Pack as a pilot TV film in August 1997.  When it finally aired it was known as Escape From Atlantis.

Series
Hercules: The Legendary Journeys
 Vanishing Son
 Xena: Warrior Princess
 Back2Back Action Hour
Jack of All Trades
Cleopatra 2525

Theme song
The theme song is used in the Action Pack opening sequence, sponsorships, as well as the full version of the theme used in promos for the TV movies. The theme was composed by Velton Ray Bunch.

Carrying stations

 KTLA, Los Angeles
 KLRT, Little Rock
 KOFY, San Francisco
 WPIX, New York
 WSBK, Boston
 KPLR, St. Louis
 WDZL, Miami
 KDFW, KTXA, KDFI, KDAF, Dallas
 KIAH Houston
 WGN, Chicago
 KRCW, Portland
 WCWB, Pittsburgh
 WGNX, Atlanta
 WDCA-20, WDCW, Washington, DC
 WFLX, West Palm Beach
 KYES, Anchorage
 WCWJ, Jacksonville
 WNUV, Baltimore
 WFLI, Chattanooga, TN
 WFVT, Rock Hill, SC / Charlotte, NC
 WLMT-TV, Memphis, TN
 WPSG, Philadelphia, PA
 WUPA, Atlanta, GA
 WFTC, Minneapolis/St. Paul, MN
 WKBD, Detroit, MI
 WKCF, WOFL, Orlando, FL
 WTVT, Tampa, FL
 KUTP, Phoenix, AZ
 WUAB, Cleveland

References

Television syndication packages
Television programming blocks in the United States
First-run syndicated television programs in the United States
1990s American television series
1994 American television series debuts
2001 American television series endings
Television series by Universal Television